James Bond 007: Everything or Nothing is a third-person shooter video game based on the James Bond films. It was developed by EA Redwood Shores and published by Electronic Arts under the EA Games label for the GameCube, PlayStation 2, and Xbox. The game features a cast of voice actors including Pierce Brosnan, reprising his film role as MI6 agent James Bond. Other returning actors include Richard Kiel, John Cleese and Judi Dench, as Jaws, Q and M respectively. It is considered as a continuation of Die Another Day (2002), featuring Brosnan in his final performance as Bond.

Development on the game began in 2001. Written by Bruce Feirstein, Danny Bilson and Paul De Meo, Everything or Nothing centers around Bond dealing with the use of nanotechnology as terrorism. The player controls Bond, and the game includes several driving levels. It is the second Bond game played in third-person after Tomorrow Never Dies (1999), and is the first Bond game to feature a two-player cooperative mode.

Everything or Nothing was released in February 2004. It received "generally positive reviews" according to Metacritic.

Gameplay
The gameplay is a mix of third-person shooting/action sequences and vehicle sequences. In third-person missions, Bond can typically use cover, engage in hand-to-hand combat, use gadgets and perform some context-sensitive actions, while driving sequences primarily involve racing to a specific objective.

The game is identical across each console, aside from minor graphical and sound differences. The PlayStation 2 version included an online cooperative two-player mode. Electronic Arts retired the game's servers in January 2006.

Another version of Everything or Nothing was published for the Game Boy Advance and can be linked to the GameCube version via the GameCube – Game Boy Advance link cable, providing unique premium content.

Plot
The game opens in Tajikistan, 2004, where MI6 agent James Bond "007" infiltrates a stronghold where an organization sells a stolen Soviet suitcase bomb. Bond triggers a firefight between the two factions making the exchange, using the confusion to steal the device and escape.

The disappearance of Oxford scientist Dr. Katya Nadanova (Heidi Klum), who oversees a top-secret nanotechnology humanitarian project, leads 007 to a weapons research facility in the Sahara, where he is ordered to rescue Nadanova and prevent the theft of the nanobot prototypes. Destroying the facility, Bond follows the kidnappers onto an armored train where he encounters and dispatches Jaws (using the likeness of Richard Kiel). Bond discovers Nadanova and rescues her before pursuing the terrorist via helicopter through the Valley of the Kings. Bond defeats the terrorist and takes Nadanova to her safehouse, where, after Bond departs, it is revealed that she is working in conjunction with Nikolai Diavolo (Willem Dafoe), a former KGB agent whose mentor and friend was Max Zorin (the primary antagonist of the 1985 film A View to a Kill). The two intend to re-purpose the nanobots for far sinister purposes than their original intention of repairing nuclear reactors.

Upon returning to MI6, M (Judi Dench) informs Bond of the disappearance of another 00 agent, Jack Mason, alias 003, who was last seen investigating a platinum mine in Peru. Bond is sent there to track down Mason's last known contact Serena St. Germaine (Shannon Elizabeth), an American geologist who may have a clue to his whereabouts. Serena takes Bond to a mining complex where he discovers Mason is being tortured by Diavolo. Before succumbing to his wounds, Mason informs Bond that Diavolo intends to move his operations to New Orleans. Bond learns of Nadanova's ties with Diavolo when she captures Serena and throws her out of a helicopter. Bond dives off a cliff to rescue her through the use of Q's (John Cleese) rappel gadget and the two escape Diavolo's mercenaries via tank.

Searching New Orleans, Bond learns that Diavolo has enlisted a war criminal named Arkady Yayakov to help re-purpose the nanobots. Bond infiltrates a factory owned by Diavolo and uncovers a lead pointing to a local nightclub owned by Yayakov, where he crosses paths with Mya Starling (Mýa), an NSA field operative who is also investigating Diavolo. However, Starling's cover is blown and she is held by Yayakov in a 19th-century graveyard. Bond rescues Starling and dispatches of Yayakov's remaining men.

007 tracks Diavolo's operations to an abandoned plantation in Louisiana, where he discovers he has altered Nadanova's nanobots to eat through all metals but platinum, disintegrating everything they come in contact with. Destroying the laboratory and killing Yayakov, Bond finds a tanker of nanobots which is being driven by Jaws to the levees of New Orleans with the intent of flooding the city. Bond destroys the truck before it can reach the levees, and returns to Peru to further investigate Diavolo's platinum mines.

After winning a rally race hosted by Diavolo, Bond finds he has captured Serena, allowing Diavolo to escape to the mines. After saving Serena, Bond reaches the mines, but is captured by Nadanova. Diavolo explains that he intends to use the nanobots to destroy the Kremlin and use his army of tanks, armored with platinum to make them immune to the nanobots, to control Russia, and then overthrow Europe. Tied in the path of a mining drill, Bond escapes his shackles and flees the mines in a helicopter piloted by Serena.

Following Diavolo to Moscow, Bond steals one of Diavolo's platinum tanks and uses it to prevent the release of the nanobots in Red Square and heads for a missile silo hidden under the Kremlin. Bond kills Jaws and deactivates the nanotech missiles. Diavolo and Nadanova then pursue Bond with a Soviet fighter jet. Bond destroys the jet and Nadanova is killed, although Diavolo ejects just in time. Diavolo reaches a control tower, reactivating one of the missiles and targeting it at London. Bond destroys the control tower, where Diavolo launches the missile before falling to his death into the silo. Destroying the missile as it launches, Bond prevents the catastrophe and reunites with Serena outside the Kremlin.

Development and release
Development on Everything or Nothing began in 2001. Early on, writer Bruce Feirstein was brought in to help create the game's storyline. Feirstein had previously written several recent Bond films. Feirstein wrote the game's screenplay, based on a story by Danny Bilson and Paul De Meo. Everything or Nothing was developed and published by Electronic Arts (EA), which announced the game in May 2003. EA Redwood Shores handled most of the development, while the driving portions were created by a separate EA team based in Canada. The latter team had previously worked on EA's Need for Speed series, and Everything or Nothing uses a modified version of the game engine used for Need for Speed: Porsche Unleashed (2000). While previous Bond games included driving levels, Everything or Nothing offers a wider variety of vehicles.

The game's third-person perspective was a change from the first-person view typically used in earlier Bond games. Game producer Scott Bandy said "we figure that to be Bond, you've got to see Bond. We felt that the first-person perspective, although exciting, didn't put Bond's full potential in the hands of the player. Bond's hand-to-hand fighting style, for example, is almost completely absent in a first-person experience. Bond also fights smart, using cover and corners to his advantage, and third-person is a much better place for that kind of gameplay".

Everything or Nothing is designed to resemble a Bond film. The game features a voice cast of notable actors, some reprising their roles from the films. The cast includes Pierce Brosnan (James Bond), Judi Dench (M), John Cleese (Q), Willem Dafoe (Nikolai Diavolo), Heidi Klum (Katya Nadanova), and Shannon Elizabeth (Serena St. Germaine). The actors also provided their likenesses for the game, including Richard Kiel, reprising his role as Jaws.

A Cyberware scanning machine was used to replicate the actors' faces, and the development team also referenced hundreds of photos and hours of video to fine-tune their appearances. Motion capture was also used. Japanese actress Misaki Ito portrays Q's assistant, Miss Nagai. Klum is featured on the game's North American cover art, while Ito appears on the Japanese cover. Singer Mýa portrays agent Mya Starling, and also sings the song "Everything or Nothing". The in-game music was composed by composer Sean Callery, with additional music by Jeff Tymoschuk.

Everything or Nothing was originally set for release on November 4, 2003. However, in September of that year, EA delayed the game until early 2004, allowing for more time in development. EA used the delay to polish the game and to add the cooperative multiplayer mode. Everything or Nothing was completed on January 30, 2004, and began shipping to U.S. retailers on February 17, with release expected within two days. It was released in the U.K. on February 27, 2004. It was one of the first video games to undergo THX's audio certification process.

Reception

James Bond 007: Everything or Nothing received "generally positive" reviews, according to review aggregator Metacritic. GameSpot called it "a really great game, perhaps the best James Bond game ever made". GameSpot later named it the best PlayStation 2 game of February 2004, and it was a runner-up for the publication's annual "Best Game Based on a TV or Film Property" award. IGN also named it the Game of the Month for February 2004. IGN said "EA shakes things up and gives us a fresh new perspective on how good Bond can be." The game achieved Platinum Hits status on the Xbox, selling more than two million copies on the Microsoft's console.

However, some critics were not as impressed. UK gaming magazine Edge stated that, "It's perhaps because the title benefits from such a high production spend, in fact, that the average design and execution becomes more pronounced."

Maxim gave it a perfect ten and stated that players can "race through a shitstorm of artillery fire in a Porsche Cayenne Turbo (complete with "Q-cloak" invisibility feature) or missile-firing Triumph Daytona 600." The Times gave it all five stars and stated that "the over-the-shoulder style does allow for the seamless integration of glossy scenes to drive on the plot and add a more genuine movie-like feel to the game." The Cincinnati Enquirer gave it four-and-a-half stars out of five and called it "An ambitious but successful interactive adventure that blurs the lines between motion pictures and video games." Entertainment Weekly wrote, "Action addicts still get their share of mayhem, however, as EON delivers some spectacular levels, including a breakneck highway chase on a flamethrower-equipped motorcycle. Her Majesty would definitely approve." The Village Voice wrote, "The seamless action—now presented in third person—is spit-shined and ever shifting."

In 2008, Anthony Burch of Destructoid compared the game to a "bad Bond film" such as Tomorrow Never Dies or The World Is Not Enough, citing its mix of "ridiculously bombastic car chases, complete lack of subtlety, and clever cinematic presentation". He was critical of the controls and believed that Everything or Nothing, like previous Bond games, had failed to live up to the success of GoldenEye (1997). However, he considered it "halfway decent" when judged on its own. In 2015, Dan Griliopoulos of TechRadar ranked it as the second best Bond game of all time, behind GoldenEye.

Notes

References

External links

 

2004 video games
Cooperative video games
Electronic Arts games
MGM Interactive games
Everything or Nothing
GameCube games
PlayStation 2 games
Stealth video games
Third-person shooters
Nanotechnology in fiction
Video games scored by Jeff Tymoschuk
Video games scored by Sean Callery
Video games set in Egypt
Video games set in New Orleans
Video games set in Peru
Video games set in Scotland
Video games set in Tajikistan
Video games set in Tunisia
Video games set in Russia
Video games set in the United States
Xbox games
Multiplayer and single-player video games
Visceral Games
Id Tech games
Video games developed in the United States
Games with GameCube-GBA connectivity